Argiloborus is a genus of ground beetles in the family Carabidae. There are more than 50 described species in Argiloborus.

Species
These 51 species belong to the genus Argiloborus:

 Argiloborus agostii Giachino, 2003
 Argiloborus alutaceus (Jeannel, 1957)
 Argiloborus amblygonus Jeannel, 1960
 Argiloborus ambreanus Jeannel, 1963
 Argiloborus andriai Jeannel, 1963
 Argiloborus andringitrae Giachino, 2008
 Argiloborus angustus Jeannel, 1963
 Argiloborus ankaratrae Jeannel, 1957
 Argiloborus balinensis Giachino, 2003
 Argiloborus besucheti Giachino, 2003
 Argiloborus brevicollis Jeannel, 1958
 Argiloborus brevis Jeannel, 1963
 Argiloborus bulirschi Giachino, 2008
 Argiloborus burckhardti Giachino, 2003
 Argiloborus ceylanicus Jeannel, 1960
 Argiloborus curtus Jeannel, 1960
 Argiloborus fianarantsoae Giachino, 2008
 Argiloborus fisheri Giachino, 2008
 Argiloborus furcatus Giachino, 2008
 Argiloborus gracilis Jeannel, 1960
 Argiloborus huberi Giachino, 2003
 Argiloborus imerinae Jeannel, 1957
 Argiloborus indicus Jeannel, 1960
 Argiloborus indonesianus Giachino, 2003
 Argiloborus insularis Jeannel, 1957
 Argiloborus janaki Giachino, 2008
 Argiloborus javanicus Giachino, 2003
 Argiloborus laticollis Jeannel, 1963
 Argiloborus loebli Giachino, 2003
 Argiloborus malaysianus Giachino, 2003
 Argiloborus monticola Jeannel, 1960
 Argiloborus moraveci Giachino, 2008
 Argiloborus murphyi Mateu, 1969
 Argiloborus nativitatis Giachino, 2016
 Argiloborus pauliani (Jeannel, 1952)
 Argiloborus perineti Giachino, 2008
 Argiloborus planatus Jeannel, 1963
 Argiloborus praslinicus Giachino, 2015
 Argiloborus punctaticollis Jeannel, 1963
 Argiloborus pusillus Jeannel, 1958
 Argiloborus quadraticollis (Jeannel, 1957)
 Argiloborus remyi Jeannel, 1958
 Argiloborus riedeli Giachino, 2001
 Argiloborus roberti Giachino, 2003
 Argiloborus scotti Jeannel, 1937
 Argiloborus sogai Jeannel, 1963
 Argiloborus stricticollis Jeannel, 1960
 Argiloborus tenuis (Jeannel, 1952)
 Argiloborus thailandicus Zaballos, 1988
 Argiloborus thoracicus Jeannel, 1957
 Argiloborus vadoni (Jeannel, 1952)

References

Trechinae